Hellhole is a 2022 horror film set in a Polish monastery in 1987, when a police officer investigating mysterious disappearances infiltrates a remote monastery and discovers a dark truth about its clergy. It is directed by Bartosz M. Kowalski, who also helped write the screenplay with his frequent writing partner, Mirella Zaradkiewicz.

Plot
In 1957, a priest in a church attempts to murder a baby that bears a unique scar on his chest, referring to it the "spawn of evil." Before the priest can continue, the Milicja arrive and shoot the priest.

Thirty years later, Father Marek meets Prior Andrzej at a secluded church that serves as a sanatorium where women thought to be possessed by the Devil are brought for exorcism. In his room, Marek unpacks, unzipping a concealed compartment that contains a pistol, flashlight, and other items not allowed on the property, as well as a newspaper clip about a missing woman. At one point, he bares his chest, revealing an unusual scar similar to that of the baby. He begins to experience strange phenomena in his room - the cross on the wall rotates, the bathroom mirror fractures, and the wardrobe makes creepy gurgling sounds.

Marek is called to witness a woman's apparent exorcism. She screams while the Prior recites holy words. In addition, the bed quakes, a strange wind blows, and the Prior's cross catches fire. When Marek investigates the room later, he discovers that all the effects were staged. However, he also experiences more strange and inexplicable phenomena. He joins the priests for meals but has trouble eating the exceptionally unappetizing food, which makes him retch. One day one of his teeth breaks open, revealing a live fly. A few days after the exorcism, he witnesses the priests burying a casket in the church's graveyard, presumably for the girl, whose room is now empty. Piotr, the vice Prior, approaches him stealthily and asks him to meet in the confessional, where he says that the church is watching both of them and warns Marek to be careful, because those who disobey are severely punished. Marek reveals that he is a militiaman investigating an anonymous tip about missing local women, disguised as a priest because the militia does not want to openly meddle in church business after the murder of the priest Jerzy Popieluszko. According to Piotr, the Prior fakes the exorcisms to defraud the Curia and the Vatican; however, he doesn't know what happens to the women following their exorcisms. Marek searches his room for surveillance devices and finds a bizarre bone-and-eyeball device in a gap behind the closet. He hurls the device into the trash and vomits up a dark liquid full of flies that buzz and take off, and hallucinates his face being drenched in the liquid. Later, he sneaks out to dig up the exorcised woman's grave and finds an empty coffin. At this moment, Father Dawid captures Marek, knocking him out.

Marek wakes up tied to his bed. Prior Andrzej and Father Dawid force him to consume four more portions of cooked meat, after which Marek loses consciousness. When Father Dawid dozes off, Marek frees himself; in a subsequent struggle, he fatally shoots the Father. In the kitchen, he finds the bodies of the missing women hanging on hooks in the freezer and realizes he was being fed their organs. Piotr discovers him there and convinces him to go to the library, where he explains that the priests believe Marek to be the "chosen one," a baby born during an eclipse who could be used to complete a ritual that involved eating the flesh of seven sinners and drinking the blood of an innocent, after which it would transform into a demon, ushering in a new era of world order. According to Piotr, the church's former priest had tried to kill Marek at birth but failed. However, the current priests were working to complete the ritual and realize his destiny. Piotr leads Marek to a hidden exit to the sanatorium, where he betrays him to the other priests, who incapacitate him and drag him back to the sanatorium.

When Marek awakens, he is restrained. The Prior explains to him that the militia's anonymous tip was intended to lure Marek to the sanatorium. He says that God and the Devil once ruled side by side, and humans are evil and should be punished by the Devil. The brotherhood has been awaiting the chosen one's birth for 800 years, and the church itself was constructed around a well that served as a portal to hell. Once the ritual is complete, the Evil One will pass through the portal to hell and assume the body of the chosen one. They envision themselves as the Devil's servants, assisting him in ruling the new world.

The priests then bring in a young woman, slit her throat and gather her blood, which they drink and then force Marek to partake in. However, after they finish the ritual, nothing happens. In a panic, the priests decided to hide all of the murders. Piotr stabs Marek and tosses his body into the well, while the Prior retreats to his quarters and gets exceptionally drunk. Piotr finds him there and offers to help him to bed, but instead suffocates him with a pillow. Unnoticed, the cross in the Prior's room turns upside down. At the bottom of the well, Marek awakens atop a pile of bones and convulses in agony.

The next morning, Piotr assumes control of the sanatorium and leads a prayer service for the Prior. In the middle of it, he freezes up, then levitates into the crucifixion pose before dissolving into a large cloud of flies. From the well, a transformed and now-demonic Marek enters the church, freezing the other priests when they attempt to flee before suspending them upside down in the crucifixion pose. On the large crucifix, the statue of Jesus turns to look at the demon. Outside, dead flowers and trees begin to bloom again, signifying that the dead are reviving and that the living may eventually pass away. Thunder rumbles as the sky splits open, signifying the beginning of the new global order and the transformation of Earth into Hell.

Cast
Piotr Zurawski – Marek
Olaf Lubaszenko – Prior Andrzej
Sebastian Stankiewicz – Monk Piotr
Lech Dyblik – Antoni
Rafał Iwaniuk – Monk Dawid
Krzysztof Satała – Young Monk
Malwina Dubowska – Blonde
Zbigniew Waleryś – Priest

Reception 
The review aggregator website Rotten Tomatoes reported a 60% approval rating, with an average score of 5.3/10, based on 5 reviews.

References

External links

2022 films
Demons in film
2020s supernatural horror films
Films about exorcism
Religious horror films
Polish horror films
Films set in 1987
Films set in Poland
Films shot in Poland
2020s Polish-language films
Polish-language Netflix original films